This article is team squads of Football at the 2009 East Asian Games.

Head coach:  Liu Chunming

Head coach:  Kim Pan-Gon

Head coach:  Akihiro Nishimura

Head coach: Jo Tong-Sop

Head coach:  Park Sang-In

Head coach:  Leung Sui Wing

External links
Football in Hong Kong 2009 East Asian Games Official Website

Events at the 2009 East Asian Games